Ángel Aníbal Guevara Rodríguez is a Guatemalan soldier and politician.  He was born in La Democracia, Escuintla in 1924.

Having served as defense minister in the previous administration, Guevara was victorious in the 7 March 1982 presidential election to succeed outgoing President Romeo Lucas, who had hand-picked him as his successor. The election was, however, widely denounced as fraudulent by both left-wing and right-wing groups. A military-led coup d'état two weeks after the election prevented Guevara from assuming power and instead installed a three-man junta headed by Gen. Efraín Ríos Montt.

He ran again in 1995 but failed to win much support.

References

Guatemalan military personnel
Guevara Rodriguez
People of the Guatemalan Civil War
People from Escuintla Department
Living people
Year of birth missing (living people)
Leaders ousted by a coup